The 1997–98 Danish Superliga season was the 8th season of the Danish Superliga league championship, governed by the Danish Football Association. It took place from the first match on July 25, 1997, to final match on June 1, 1998.

The Danish champions qualified for the UEFA Champions League 1998-99 qualification, while the second and third placed teams qualified for the qualification round of the UEFA Cup 1998-99. The fourth to six placed teams qualified for the UEFA Intertoto Cup 1998, while the two lowest placed teams of the tournament was directly relegated to the Danish 1st Division. Likewise, the Danish 1st Division champions and runners-up were promoted to the Superliga.

Table

Results

Top goalscorers

See also
 1997-98 in Danish football

External links
  Fixtures at NetSuperligaen.dk
  Peders Fodboldstatistik

Danish Superliga seasons
1997–98 in Danish football
Denmark